The Fighting Preacher is a 2019 drama film written and directed by T. C. Christensen and starring David McConnell and Kenna Dawn.

The film focuses on Willard Bean (Dave McConnell) and his wife, Rebecca (Cassidy Hubert), who are in involved in a 25-year missionary service in Palmyra, New York. Palmyra, which had previously driven out the last Mormons 80 years previous refuses to sell the couple supplies and harasses them. With a background in boxing, Bean finds a new way to reach the people.

Cast
 David McConnell ... Willard Bean
 Cassidy Hubert ... Rebecca Bean
 Richard Benedict ... Pliny Sexton
 Steve Anderson ... Thomas Winegar
 Charley Boon ...  Buster
 Kenna Dawn ... Palmyra

Reception
Sean Means of The Salt Lake Tribune praised Christensen's work on the film, saying he "infuses a gentle humor to the Beans’ story, capturing Willard’s good-natured sarcasm" and that the "deeply faithful will appreciate the occasional name-dropping."

The film was a finalist for the 2019 AML Award for narrative feature film.

References

External links

2019 films
Mormon cinema
Films set in 1915
Films directed by T. C. Christensen
2010s English-language films